The China Railways KD23 class locomotive was a class of 2-8-0 steam locomotives operated by the China Railway. Originally amongst the first locomotives ordered by the South Manchuria Railway (Mantetsu), they were built by ALCo of the United States in 1906, and they were later operated by the privately owned Jichang Jidun Railway and its successor, the Manchukuo National Railway. The "Sori" name comes from the American naming system for steam locomotives, in which the 2-8-0 wheel arrangement is called "Consolidation".

History
Part of the first group of locomotives ordered by Mantetsu after converting to standard gauge was two 2-8-0 locomotives from ALCO.  The Mantetsu records indicate that the engines were built at ALCo's Schenectady works, originally for the Boston & Maine Railroad.  However, ALCo's records indicate that they were built at the Rhode Island facility. Numbered 1 and 2 when first delivered, they were designated class H and renumbered 1000 and 1001 when Mantetsu introduced its second classification system in 1907. After brief use on the mainline, they were reassigned to haul goods trains on the Anfeng Line in 1912. Due to the inconvenience of operating and maintaining only two locomotives of distinctive design, Mantetsu transferred both to the Jichang Railway in 1919, which in 1931 merged with the Jidun Railway to form the Jichang Jidun Railway, where they were numbered 301 and 302. In 1933, the Manchukuo National Railway was created through the nationalisation and merger of several privately owned railways, including the Jichang Jidun Railway, and these locomotives passed on to the Manchukuo National, which classified them Sorishi (ソリシ) class, numbered 6050 and 6051, becoming Soriro (ソリロ) 505 and 506 in 1938. 

The Manchukuo National had eight other locomotives in the (1938) Soriro class, numbered ソリロ501–ソリロ504 and ソリロ507-510, but the origins of these engines is unknown; these were all sent to the Chosen Government Railway (Sentetsu) in Korea by 1942.

Postwar
After the end of the Pacific War the two built for Mantetsu were operated by the China Railway as class ㄎㄉ23 (KD23) until 1959, when they became class KD23 (written in Pinyin instead of Zhuyin).

The eight that were on loan to Sentetsu remained in Korea and were taken up by the Korean State Railway in North Korea, where they were designated 소리유 (Soriyu) class, and the Korean National Railroad in South Korea, where they were designated 소리6 (Sori6) class. Known to have been operated by the KNR was 소리6-507, formerly Sentetsu ソリロ507 and previously Manchukuo National ソリロ507.

References

2-8-0 locomotives
ALCO locomotives
Railway locomotives introduced in 1906
Steam locomotives of China
Standard gauge locomotives of China
Rolling stock of Manchukuo
Locomotives of Korea
Locomotives of South Korea
Locomotives of North Korea
Freight locomotives